The Consulate General of Peru in Tokyo is one of two diplomatic representations of Peru in Tokyo, the other being the Peruvian embassy.

The current consul general is Anne Maeda Ikehata.

List of Consuls general
Edgar Eduardo Gómez-Sánchez Gutti (until 2002)
Carlos Alberto Yrigoyen Forno (2002–2003)
Héctor Francisco Matallana Martínez (2004–2007)
Edgar Eduardo Fernando Gómez-Sánchez Gutti (2007–2011)
Julio Arturo Cárdenas Velarde (2011–2014)
Jorge Arturo Jallo Sandoval (2014–2019)
Alexis Paul Aquino Albengrin (2019–2021)
Anne Maeda Ikehata (since 2021)

Overview
The consulate general's jurisdiction extends to the following prefectures:

See also
Embassy of Peru, Tokyo
Consulate General of Peru, Nagoya

References

Peru
Tokyo
Japan–Peru relations